Kah Sara (also Romanized as Kāh Sarā; also known as Ḩājjī Mīrzā Khān, Kāh Sareh, Kālsarā, Kāsareh, Kāsehrāh, and Kāsereh) is a village in Qaleh Shahin Rural District, in the Central District of Sarpol-e Zahab County, Kermanshah Province, Iran. At the 2006 census, its population was 475, in 97 families.

References 

Populated places in Sarpol-e Zahab County